Souris-Elmira is a provincial electoral district for the Legislative Assembly of Prince Edward Island, Canada. The riding was created for the 1996 election from 1st Kings and a small part of 5th Kings and 2nd Kings.

Members
The riding as elected the following Members of the Legislative Assembly:

Election results

2019 general election

2016 electoral reform plebiscite

2015 general election

2011 general election

2007 general election

2005 electoral reform referendum

2003 general election

2000 general election

1996 general election

References

 Souris-Elmira information

Prince Edward Island provincial electoral districts